Linga Rajendra II or Linga Raja II was the ruler of Kodagu Kingdom (r.1811-1820).
He renovated Madikeri Fort's Palace between 1812 and 1814.

He was succeeded by his son Chikka Vira Rajendra in 1820.

References

History of Kodagu district
History of Karnataka
Coorg
1820 deaths